Dan Dar Yee Moe, is a 2019 Burmese romantic drama film starring Ye Deight, Daung, Shwe Htoo and Wutt Hmone Shwe Yi. The film, produced by 7th Sense Film Production and premiered in Myanmar on July 11, 2019.

Cast
Ye Deight as Lu Nyo
Daung as Di Hlaine
Shwe Htoo as Moe Tain Nyo
Wutt Hmone Shwe Yi as Moe Hnaung

References

2019 films
2010s Burmese-language films
Burmese romantic drama films
Films shot in Myanmar
2019 romantic drama films